Scutellaria multiglandulosa is a flowering plant in the genus Scutellariaand family Lamiaceae. It grows in parts of the Southeastern United States. It is sometimes referred to by the common name '''Small's skullcap.

References

multiglandulosa